Jan Johannes Jacobus Schlebusch (born 5 May 1949) is a former South African rugby union player.

Playing career
Schlebusch finished his schooling in Kroonstad, studied at the University of the Free State and became a teacher at Grey College, in Bloemfontein. He played provincial rugby for the Free State and played in the Currie Cup finals of 1973, 1975, 1977 and 1978.

Schlebusch played three test matches for the Springboks. His first test was the third tests in the series  against the 1974 Lions team captained by Willie John McBride, played at the Boet Erasmus Stadium in Port Elizabeth. He then played in the fourth test against the Lions at Ellis Park, that ended in a 13–all draw between the teams. His third and final test match was in 1975 against France at Loftus Versfeld in Pretoria.

Test history

See also
List of South Africa national rugby union players – Springbok no.  472

References

1949 births
Living people
South African rugby union players
South Africa international rugby union players
Free State Cheetahs players
People from Kroonstad
University of the Free State alumni
Rugby union players from the Free State (province)
Rugby union centres